Teller (born Raymond Joseph Teller; February 14, 1948) is an American magician. He is half of the comedy magic duo Penn & Teller, along with Penn Jillette, where he usually does not speak during performances. Teller, along with Jillette, is an H.L. Mencken Fellow at the Cato Institute.

Personal life
Teller was born in Philadelphia, Pennsylvania, the son of Irene B. (née Derrickson) and Israel Max "Joseph" Teller (1913–2004). His father, who was of Russian-Jewish descent, was born in Brooklyn, New York, and grew up in Philadelphia. His mother was from a Delaware farming family. They met as painters attending art school at Samuel S. Fleisher Art Memorial. His mother was Methodist, and Teller was raised as "a sort of half-assed Methodist". He graduated from Philadelphia's Central High School in 1965, and in 1969 graduated from Amherst College with a Bachelor of Arts in Classics. He became a high-school Latin teacher.

Teller legally changed his birth name of Raymond Joseph Teller to the mononym "Teller".

Teller taught Greek and Latin at Lawrence High School in Lawrenceville, New Jersey. In 2001, he was inducted into the Central High School Hall of Fame.

Health
In 2018–2019, Teller had three back surgeries over 18 months. In early October 2022, he underwent open-heart surgery.

Career

Performing

Teller began performing with his friend Weir Chrisemer as The Othmar Schoeck Memorial Society for the Preservation of Unusual and Disgusting Music. He met Penn Jillette in 1974, and, with Chrisemer, they became a three-person act called Asparagus Valley Cultural Society, which started at the Minnesota Renaissance Festival and subsequently played in San Francisco. In 1981, Jillette and Teller began performing exclusively together as Penn & Teller, an act that continues to this day. On April 5, 2013, Penn and Teller were honored with a star on the Hollywood Walk of Fame in the live performance category. Their star, the 2,494th awarded, is near the one dedicated to Harry Houdini. The following day, they were recognized by the Magic Castle with the Magicians of the Year award.

Teller rarely speaks while performing but regularly speaks in other contexts, such as interviews. Teller's trademark silence originated during his youth, when he earned a living performing magic at college fraternity parties. He found that if he maintained silence throughout his act, spectators refrained from throwing beer and heckling him and paid more attention to his performance.

Writing
Teller collaborated with Jillette on three magic books, and is also the author of "When I'm Dead All This Will Be Yours!": Joe Teller – A Portrait by His Kid (2000), a biography/memoir of his father. The book features his father's paintings and 100 unpublished cartoons which were strongly influenced by George Lichty's Grin and Bear It. The book was favorably reviewed by Publishers Weekly. Teller's father's "wryly observed scenes of Philadelphia street life" were created in 1939. Teller and his father's "memories began to pump and the stories flowed" after they opened boxes of old letters that Teller read out loud (learning for the first time about a period in his parents' lives that he knew nothing about, such as the fact that his father's name is really Israel Max Teller). Joe's Depression-era hobo adventures led to travels throughout the U.S., Canada and Alaska, and by 1933, he returned to Philadelphia for art study. After Joe and Irene met during evening art classes, they married, and Joe worked half-days as a Philadelphia Inquirer copy boy. When the Inquirer rejected his cartoons, he moved into advertising art just as World War II began.

Teller is a co-author of the paper "Attention and Awareness in Stage Magic: Turning Tricks into Research", published in Nature Reviews Neuroscience (November 2008).

In 2010, Teller wrote Play Dead, a "throwback to the spook shows of the 1930s and '40s" that ran September 12–24 in Las Vegas before opening Off Broadway in New York. The show stars sideshow performer and magician Todd Robbins.

Directing
In 2008, Teller and Aaron Posner co-directed a version of Macbeth which incorporated stage magic techniques in the scenes with the Three Witches. In 2014, Teller and Posner co-directed a version of The Tempest, which again made use of stage magic; in an interview Teller stated that "Shakespeare wrote one play that's about a magician, and it seemed like about time to realize that with all the capabilities of modern magic in the theater." In 2018, Teller and Posner co-conceived and directed a brand new production of Macbeth at Chicago Shakespeare Theater in Chicago, Illinois.

Teller directed a feature film documentary, Tim's Vermeer, which was released in 2014. He and Jillette served as executive producers, with distribution by Sony Pictures Classics.

Books

Film and television

See also
 Harpo Marx

References

External links

 
 
 

1948 births
20th-century atheists
21st-century atheists
American atheism activists
American biographers
American humanists
American magicians
American male film actors
American people of Russian-Jewish descent
Amherst College alumni
Cato Institute people
Living people
Members of the Libertarian Party (United States)
Nero Award winners
Schoolteachers from Pennsylvania
Central High School (Philadelphia) alumni